This article contains information about the literary events and publications of 1700.

Events
February 1 – Richard Bentley becomes Master of Trinity College, Cambridge.
Early March - William Congreve's comedy The Way of the World is first performed at the New Theatre, Lincoln's Inn Fields in London.
May 5 – Within days of John Dryden's death on May 1, his last written work, The Secular Masque, is performed as part of Vanbrugh's version of The Pilgrim.

New books

Fiction
Aphra Behn (died 1689) – Histories, Novels, and Translations (fiction and nonfiction)
Tom Brown – Amusements Serious and Comical
Gatien de Courtilz de Sandras – Mémoires de Monsieur d'Artagnan
Peter Anthony Motteux, editor – The History of the Renown'd Don-Quixote de la Mancha, translated by several hands, Volume 1 (Volumes 2–4 published in 1712 in the third edition)

Drama
Anonymous – Caledonia, or the Pedlar Turned Merchant
Abel Boyer – Achilles; or, Iphigenia in Aulis: a tragedy
William Burnaby – The Reformed Wife
Susannah Centlivre – The Perjur'd Husband; or, The Adventures of Venice: A tragedy
Colley Cibber – The Tragical History of King Richard III
William Congreve – The Way of the World, a comedy performed in March
John Dennis – Iphigenia: A tragedy, performed in December 1699
George Farquhar – The Constant Couple
Charles Gildon – Measure for Measure
Charles Hopkins – Friendship Improv'd; or, The Female Warriour: A tragedy, performed November 7, 1699
Francis Manning – The Generous Choice
John Oldmixon – The Grove, or Love's Paradise published ("semi-opera", music by Henry Purcell)
William Philips – St. Stephen's Green
Mary Pix – The Beau Defeated
Nicholas Rowe – The Ambitious Stepmother
Thomas Southerne – The Fate of Capua: A tragedy, performed about April
John Vanbrugh – The Pilgrim: A comedy, anonymous; performed in April

Poetry
See 1700 in poetry
Richard Blackmore – A Satyr Against Wit
Thomas Brown – A Description of Mr. Dryden's Funeral, verse
Samuel Cobb – Poetae Britannici
Daniel Defoe – The Pacificator
Sor Juana Inés de la Cruz – Fama y obras póstumas del Fénix de México
William King – The Transactioneer With Some of his Philosophical Fancies (satire of Philosophical Transactions)
John Pomfret – Reason
John Tutchin – The Foreigners, published anonymously (verse satire on William III's Dutch ministers; Daniel Defoe replied in The True-Born Englishman in 1701))
Ned Ward – The Reformer

Non-fiction
Mary Astell – Some Reflections upon Marriage
James Brome – Travels over England, Scotland, and Wales
Jeremy Collier – A Second Defence of the Short View of the Profaneness and Immorality of the English Stage &c (See 1698 in literature)
Eugenia (authorship unknown) – The Female Advocate: Or, a plea for the just liberty of the tender sex, and particularly of married women...
Francis Moore – Vox Stellarum: An almanac for 1701 (first in a series of yearly "almanacs" of astrology)
Sir William Temple – Letters Written by Sir W. Temple, and Other Ministers of State, Both at Home and Abroad (putatively edited by Jonathan Swift)
Pavao Ritter Vitezović – Croatia Rediviva
Ned Ward – A Step to the Bath: With a character of the place, published anonymously

Births
February 2 – Johann Christoph Gottsched, German philosopher (died 1766)
May 25 – Nicolaus Ludwig Zinzendorf, German theologian (died 1760)
September 11 – James Thomson, Scottish poet (died 1748)
November 25 – Kata Bethlen, Hungarian memoirist and correspondent (died 1759)

Deaths
January 7 – Raffaello Fabretti, Italian antiquary (born 1618)
March 14 – Henry Killigrew, English clergyman, poet and playwright (born 1613)
May 12
Joseph Athias, Spanish-born publisher of Hebrew Bible (born 1635)
John Dryden English poet (born 1631)
July – Thomas Creech, English translator (born 1659; suicide)
August 6 – Johann Beer, Austrian author, court official and composer (born 1655; hunting accident)
August 8 – Joseph Moxon, English mathematician and lexicographer (born 1627)
August 22 – Carlos de Sigüenza y Góngora, Mexican priest, poet, geographer, and historian (born 1645)
Unknown date – Charles Hopkins, Anglo-Irish poet and dramatist (born 1664)

References

 
Years of the 17th century in literature